Argyrotaenia oligachthes is a species of moth of the family Tortricidae. It is found in Costa Rica.

References

Moths described in 1932
oligachthes
Moths of the Caribbean